Nobody Runs Forever, also called The High Commissioner, is a 1968 British political neo noir spy thriller action film directed by Ralph Thomas and based on Jon Cleary's 1966 novel The High Commissioner. It stars Rod Taylor as Australian policeman Scobie Malone and Christopher Plummer as the Australian High Commissioner in Britain caught up in corrupt dealings, during delicate negotiations. Taylor's production company was involved in making the film, as was the American company Selmur Productions.

Plot
Sergeant Scobie Malone of the New South Wales Police (NSW Police) is summoned to Sydney by the gruff Premier of New South Wales, Mr Flannery, who asks Malone to travel to London and arrest the senior Australian diplomat in Britain, Sir James Quentin, High Commissioner to the UK. Sir James, a political rival of the Premier, has become the only suspect in a 17-year-old murder case.

Upon his arrival at the Australian High Commission in London, Malone meets Lady Quentin and her husband, as well as Sir James's secretary. Sir James does not object to being arrested, but he asks for a few days to conclude delicate peace negotiations. As Malone waits as a guest of the High Commission, he uncovers a plot to assassinate Sir James, masterminded by the head of a dangerous spy ring, Maria Cholon.

Cast
 Rod Taylor as "Scobie" Malone 
 Christopher Plummer as Sir James Quentin
 Lilli Palmer as Lady Sheila Quentin
 Camilla Sparv as Lisa Pretorius
 Daliah Lavi as Maria Cholon 
 Clive Revill as Joseph 
 Lee Montague as Denzil 
 Calvin Lockhart as "Jamaica"
 Derren Nesbitt as Pallain
 Edric Connor as Julius 
 Paul Grist as Coburn 
 Burt Kwouk as Pham Chinh
 Russell Napier as Leeds 
 Ken Wayne as Ferguson 
 Charles "Bud" Tingwell as Jacko (as Charles Tingwell)
 Franchot Tone as Ambassador Townsend
 Leo McKern as	Flannery (uncredited)
 Peter Reynolds as Casino Manager (uncredited)
 Tony Selby as	Cameraman (uncredited)

Production
In August 1966 Cleary said Frank Sinatra was interested in buying the film rights.

Film rights were sold in December 1966.

Filmed in Australia and London, this was the last big-screen appearance of Franchot Tone, who plays the American ambassador.

Rod Taylor has a rare opportunity to play an Australian, even though that is his native land. Taylor's unsophisticated integrity is contrasted with the London diplomatic scene throughout the film.

Taylor accepted the role on the proviso he could rewrite some of the script. In particular, the opening scene where Scobie Malone arrests Jacko (Charles Tingwell) is Rod's work.

Ralph Thomas later said "I was a hired hand" on the film; "It was ok".

Differences from novel
There were several key changes from the novel, including:
introducing Scobie Malone as an outback policeman;
reducing the emphasis on the peace conference being for the Vietnam War and making it something more vague;
Scobie having sex with Maria Cholon.

Reception
The film earned rentals of $455,000 in North America and $150,000 elsewhere. It recorded a loss of $1,185,000.

It recorded admissions in France of 44,083.

See also
 List of British films of 1968

References

External links

1968 films
1960s action thriller films
1960s spy thriller films
British spy thriller films
British action thriller films
British detective films
1960s English-language films
Films scored by Georges Delerue
Films based on works by Jon Cleary
Films directed by Ralph Thomas
Films set in London
Films set in Sydney
Films shot in Australia
Films shot in London
Films shot at Pinewood Studios
British political thriller films
1960s British films